Tenor Madness Too! is an album by saxophonist Ricky Ford which was recorded in 1992 and released on the Muse label. The album title and cover reference the Sonny Rollins album Tenor Madness.

Track listing
All compositions by Ricky Ford except where noted
 "Summer Summit" – 5:31
 "Ballad de Jour" – 4:48
 "Blues Abstractions" – 5:24
 "Up a Step" (Hank Mobley) – 6:05	
 "Con Alma" (Dizzy Gillespie) – 7:04
 "Soul Eyes" (Mal Waldron) – 6:12
 "Rollin' and Strollin'" – 5:20
 "I Got It Bad (and That Ain't Good)" (Duke Ellington, Paul Francis Webster) – 6:18
 "Nigeria Blues" – 4:34

Personnel
Ricky Ford, Antoine Roney - tenor saxophone
Donald Brown – piano 
Peter Washington – bass 
Louis Hayes – drums

References

Muse Records albums
Ricky Ford albums
1992 albums
Albums recorded at Van Gelder Studio